

Hydropower

Peninsular Malaysia
Tenaga Nasional Berhad operates three hydroelectric schemes in the peninsula with an installed generating capacity of 1,911 megawatts (MW). They are the Sungai Perak, Terengganu and Cameron Highlands hydroelectric schemes with 21 dams in operation. A number of Independent Power Producers also own and operate several small hydro plants.

Independent hydroelectric schemes
 Sg Kenerong Small Hydro Power Station in Kelantan at Sungai Kenerong, 20 MW owned by Musteq Hydro Sdn Bhd, a subsidiary of Eden Inc Berhad

Gas-fired

Note: GT – Gas Turbine unit(s); ST – Steam Turbine unit(s).

Coal-fired (or combined gas/coal)

Note: ST – Steam Turbine unit(s).

Oil-fired

Biomass

Hybrid power stations
Pulau Perhentian Kecil, Terengganu with a combined capacity of 650 kilowatts
 Two 100 kW wind turbines
 One 100 kW solar panels
 Two diesel generators capable of 200 and 150 kW respectively

Under construction
 Pengerang Cogeneration Plant
 Baleh Hydroelectric Power Plant
 1200MW Pulau Indah Power Plant
 1200MW Kedah Power Plant

See also

 Energy policy of Malaysia
 National Grid, Malaysia

References

External links
 TNB Generation Division
 Association of IPPs in Malaysia (Penjana Bebas)
 Energy Commission of Malaysia
 Malaysia Energy Centre
 Malakoff Corporation Berhad

Malaysia
 
Power stations